The Tamana Formation is a geologic formation in Trinidad and Tobago. It preserves fossils dating back to the Burdigalian to Serravallian period.

See also 
 List of fossiliferous stratigraphic units in Trinidad and Tobago

References

Further reading 
 K. G. Johnson. 2001. Middle Miocene recovery of Caribbean reef corals: new data from the Tamana Formation, Trinidad. Journal of Paleontology 75(3):513-526

Geologic formations of Trinidad and Tobago
Neogene Trinidad and Tobago
Burdigalian
Langhian
Serravallian
Limestone formations
Reef deposits